'Darrreen Siwes' (b 1968, Aelaide, South Australia) is an Australian artist. He is of Indigenous and Dutch descent.

He completed a Bachelor of Visual Arts (Hons), (1996) and a Graduate Diploma of Education (1997) at the University of South Australia.

He has a unique style of photographing familiar South Australian landmarks, and using long exposure to reveal the ghostly figure of an Aboriginal man in a suit and tie onto the image. More recently he has used female figures in this same style. Siwes' work is political in this sense. He says he is inspired by contemporary Indigenous Australian artists such as Tracey Moffatt and Gordon Bennett, and is interested in exploring the possibilities of Aboriginal art in new forms and new media.

Siwes is represented by Greenaway Art Gallery in Adelaide and Nellie Castan Gallery in Melbourne.

Awards
 2002, Anne & Gordon Samstag International Visual Arts Scholarship

Individual exhibitions
 2001, Misperceptions, Greenaway Art Gallery, Adelaide, Nellie Caston Gallery, Melbourne
 1997, Fall, Institute of Modern Art, Brisbane
 1997, Horizon Scenes, University of California, Irvine Gallery, Los Angeles
 1996, Castles in the Air, Metro Galleries, Brisbane
 1996, Natural Alibis, Institute of Modern Art, Brisbane

Selected group exhibitions
 2001, ARCO (Arte Contemporáneo) World Art Fair, Madrid
 2000, Across, Canberra School of Art Gallery, Canberra
 2000, State of My Country: a survey of Contemporary Aboriginal Art, Hogarth Gallery, Sydney
 2000, Chemistry, Art Gallery of South Australia, Adelaide
 2000, Beyond the Pale: Adelaide Biennial of Contemporary Art, Art Gallery of South Australia, Adelaide
 1999, Living Here & Now: Art & Politics, Australian Perspecta Exhibition, Art Gallery of New South Wales
 1998, 15th National Aboriginal & Torres Strait Islander Art Awards, Museum and Art Gallery of the Northern Territory, Darwin, and touring
 1998, Three Views of Kaurna Territory Now, Artspace, Adelaide Festival Centre, Adelaide
 1996, Guddhabungan, Jabal Centre, Australian National University, Canberra

Collections
 Art Gallery of South Australia
 Artbank

References

Australian Aboriginal artists
Australian people of Dutch descent
Living people
1968 births